Guy Henry (born 17 October 1960) is an English actor whose roles include Henrik Hanssen in Holby City, Pius Thicknesse in Harry Potter and the Deathly Hallows – Part 1 and Part 2, Gaius Cassius Longinus in Rome and Grand Moff Tarkin in Rogue One.

Early life and career
Henry was born on 17 October 1960 in London. He attended Homefield School and then Brockenhurst College in Hampshire where he took A levels. He trained at RADA (1979–81). In 1982, he took the title role in ITV's Young Sherlock Holmes series, playing Holmes as a teenager (though Henry was by then nearly 22).

In February 2015, Henry was announced as a  public supporter of Chapel Lane Theatre Company based in Stratford-Upon-Avon.

Stage work

Highcliffe Charity Players
Henry first appeared on stage as a footman in amateur dramatic society Highcliffe Charity Players' production of Cinderella at age 11. He is now the president of HCP and continues to support their productions.

RSC work
Henry's main work has been with the Royal Shakespeare Company, including the following roles:

1991 – Thurio (The Two Gentlemen of Verona), Poggio (Tis Pity She's a Whore), Ananias (The Alchemist).
1992 – Osric (Hamlet), Sir Formal Trifle (The Virtuoso)
1993 – Second Tempter and Second Knight (Murder in the Cathedral), Lelio (The Venetian Twins)
1994 – Director [character name] (A Life in the Theatre)
1996 – Sir Andrew Aguecheek (Twelfth Night)
1997 – Cloten (Cymbeline), Dr Caius (The Merry Wives of Windsor)
1998 – Lord Chamberlain (Henry VIII)
1999 – Russayev (Yuri Gagarin), Octavius Caesar (Antony and Cleopatra)
2001 – Malvolio (Twelfth Night), King John (King John), Mosca (Volpone)
2003 – Parolles (All's Well That Ends Well)
2013 – Captain Hook (Wendy and Peter Pan)

Other theatre work
He has also worked with Cheek by Jowl, Theatre Set Up and the National Theatre (including Turgenev in Tom Stoppard's The Coast of Utopia in 2002).

He was an acclaimed Earl of Leicester in the 2005–06 Donmar Warehouse production of Schiller's Mary Stuart, which transferred to the West End. He had previously played the same character in the 1986 film Lady Jane. From December 2008 to March 2009 he appeared as Andrew Aguecheek (alongside Derek Jacobi) in the Donmar: West End production of Twelfth Night. In April and May 2009 he appeared in Hay Fever at the Chichester Festival Theatre.

Television appearances

1980s–1990s
In 1987, Henry appeared in the episode "Rumpole and the Official Secret" from Season 4 of Rumpole of the Bailey. In the early 1990s, he played the acerbic, demonic Dr Walpurgis in The Vault of Horror, a BBC Halloween special. His make-up was provided by Hellraiser veteran Geoff Portass. Henry also introduced a few series of cult horror films in several BBC One Friday night horror seasons (with a name change to "Dr Terror"), with scripted introductions written by horror novelist and film historian Kim Newman. He appeared in the 1996 schools series Look and Read: Spywatch, and in ITV's 1996 adaptation of Emma. In 1998 he appeared in the medical soap opera Peak Practice, and in two episodes of The Grand.

2000 onwards
He appeared in four episodes of the 2001 series of the medical soap Doctors.

He has also frequently been cast as a conspiratorial and/or Machiavellian civil servant, as in Fields of Gold (2002) and Foyle's War (in a 2003 episode). He played the title role in Channel 4's 2004 documentary Who Killed Thomas Becket? (a "promotion" from his role as Tempter in the RSC Murder in the Cathedral, T. S. Eliot's version of the same story); and was a deportment tutor and a shoemaker respectively in the BBC's adaptation of The Young Visiters  (2003) and Sherlock Holmes and the Case of the Silk Stocking (Christmas 2004). He played the part of Corporal Ludovic in the C4 presentation of Evelyn Waugh's Sword of Honour trilogy (2001) alongside the then relatively unknown Daniel Craig.

In 2004 he appeared in Waking the Dead series 3 "Multistorey" as Guy Reynolds.

In 2005 he appeared in the feature-length ITV drama Colditz and had a recurring role in Extras, which continued into a few episodes of the comedy's second season. He also had a small role in the ITV drama, Trial & Retribution IX: The Lovers. His main role that year, however, was as Cassius (fictionalised version of Gaius Longinus Cassius) in the last two or three episodes of the first series of HBO/BBC series Rome. He reprised this role in the second series (broadcast 2007) until the character's death at the Battle of Philippi in the episode Philippi. His friend Sarah Kennedy (see #Radio) commented that this was a natural progression for one with his "lean and hungry look" (Shakespeare, Julius Caesar, 2.I).

In 2006, he played a lawyer in Midsomer Murders, appeared with Michael Sheen in Kenneth Williams: Fantabulosa! (as Hugh Paddick), and featured in the first, fifth and sixth episodes of the first series of The Chase (in another role he reprised in 2007). In 2007 he appeared as the UK's UN Ambassador in The Trial of Tony Blair and appeared in the seventh episode of the second series of Hotel Babylon. Also in 2007 he appeared on radio as Noël Coward in the Afternoon Play of 4 May 2007, "The Master and Mrs Tucker" by Roy Apps, which told of Coward's friendship with Edith Nesbit (played by Ann Bell).

In 2008, he appeared in HBO's John Adams as Jonathan Sewall, Massachusetts's Attorney General, as Mr Collins in Lost in Austen, and in Series 7, Episode 4 of Spooks.

In 2009 he appeared in Margaret and in Lewis (Series 4, Episode 1). Also in 2009 he appeared in several episodes of Ricky Gervais' BBC comedy Extras as the commissioning editor of BBC Comedy.

In 2010 he appeared as a lawyer in an episode of The IT Crowd titled "Something Happened".

In October 2010 he joined the regular cast of Holby City as surgeon Henrik Hanssen, a role he played for three years until his departure in October 2013. In October 2014, it was announced that he would rejoin the cast of Holby City.

In October 2014, he appeared as the inspector in the BBC 6-part drama Our Zoo.

In January 2015, he appeared as hypnotist Arthur Welkin in the BBC series Father Brown episode 3.3 "The Invisible Man".

In October 2016, he appeared as Mr Murthwaite in the BBC mini-series The Moonstone.

In November 2017, he appeared as the Dean of Westminster in the second season of the Rainmark Films series The Frankenstein Chronicles.

Film
Henry's film credits include appearances in Another Country with Rupert Everett, Lady Jane, England, My England film by Tony Palmer, in Stephen Fry's 2003 film Bright Young Things (appearing in the poster for it, top left) as Archie Schwert, in V for Vendetta as Conrad Heyer, in Starter for 10 as a university professor, in Expresso, in Vincente Amorim's 2008 film Good as a senior doctor in Nazi Germany and as Pius Thicknesse in Harry Potter and the Deathly Hallows – Part 1 and Part 2. 

In 2014, he appeared in the critically acclaimed short film Done In. 

In 2016, Henry appeared in Rogue One: A Star Wars Story, providing the physical and vocal performance for Grand Moff Tarkin; the use of CGI special effects recreated the likeness of Peter Cushing, who died in 1994, for the character.

Selected filmography
Another Country (1984) – Head Boy
Lady Jane (1986) – Robert Dudley
England, My England (1995) – James II
Bright Young Things (2003) – Archie Schwert
EMR (2004) – Head Agent
The Trial of the King Killers (2005) – Sir Heneage Finch
V for Vendetta (2005) – Conrad Heyer
Starter for 10 (2006) – Dr Morrison
Filth and Wisdom (2008) – Lorcan O'Niell
Good (2008) – Doctor
Creation (2009) – Technician
Harry Potter and the Deathly Hallows – Part 1 (2010) – Pius Thicknesse
Harry Potter and the Deathly Hallows – Part 2 (2011) – Pius Thicknesse
Retribution (2016) – Death
Rogue One (2016) – Grand Moff Tarkin
The Krays: Dead Man Walking (2018) - Lord Boothby

Radio
From around 2004 until the end of her show in 2010, Guy Henry gained an additional fanbase as a result of his friendship with the Radio 2 presenter Sarah Kennedy, who began by corresponding with his father. Through letters to Sarah from Henry himself, his father and "the Lady Agrippa" (a nickname for his mother), listeners were kept up to date on his career. A recording of his voice announced her regular "It's Showtime!" slot of tunes from the musicals at about 6.45am GMT – originally he just spoke the title of the slot, and a whole repertoire of different recordings was later added. He also occasionally appeared live on her show, and co-hosted with her as part of the annual charity appeal Children in Need.

Guest appearances
Henry was a guest speaker at an NEH (National Endowment for the Humanities) summer seminar entitled Shakespeare: Enacting the Text. (5 July to 6 August 1999).

References

External links

1960 births
Living people
20th-century English male actors
21st-century English male actors
Alumni of RADA
English male film actors
English male Shakespearean actors
English male stage actors
English male television actors
Male actors from London
Royal Shakespeare Company members